Pterostylis conferta, commonly known as the leprechaun greenhood or basalt midget greenhood,  is a plant in the orchid family Orchidaceae and is endemic to Victoria.  It has a rosette of leaves at the base of the flowering stem and up to sixteen pale green flowers in a short, crowded spike. It is a very rare orchid, similar to P. mutica, its distribution much reduced by urbanisation and agriculture.

Description
Pterostylis conferta, is a terrestrial,  perennial, deciduous, herb with an underground tuber. The dorsal sepal and petals are joined to form a hood called the "galea" over the column and which curves forward and then downwards with a pointed tip. They are joined at their bases and their edges are rolled inwards. Flowering occurs from October to January.

Taxonomy and naming
The leprechaun greenhood was first formally described in 2009 by David Jones and given the name Hymenochilus confertus from a specimen collected near Woorndoo. The description was published in Orchadian. In 2010 Gary Backhouse changed the name to Pterostylis conferta. The specific epithet (conferta) is a Latin word meaning "pressed together", "crowded", "thick" or "dense".

Distribution and habitat
Pterostylis conferta used to grow on basalt grassland but is now restricted to a single small population growing on a stony hill.

Conservation
This greenhood orchid is classified as "threatened" under the Victorian Government Flora and Fauna Guarantee Act 1988.

References

conferta
Endemic orchids of Australia
Orchids of Victoria (Australia)
Plants described in 2009